Fernando José Larraín de Toro (born September 21, 1962 in Santiago) is a Chilean comedian and film/television actor. He is of Basque descent.

Fernando started his career with the humoristic trio "Fresco y Natural después del postre", along with his brother Nicolás Larraín and Felipe Izquierdo. He also recorded a CD with his musical group called Varella. As a comedian in the 1990s, Fernando appeared in various TV shows as "Bodybuilder" and "CorazonesService" with Felipe Izquierdo. In 1998–2002, he hosted the show "Chile Tuday" (MEGA). Fernando also appeared in some films and comedy shows like "La Nany" (2005–2006) and "Casado con Hijos" (2006–2008), where obtained the main role.

Filmography

References

External links
 
 Genealogy of the Larraín family in Chile in Genealog.cl (in Spanish)

1962 births
Living people
Male actors from Santiago
Chilean people of Basque descent
21st-century Chilean male actors
Chilean male comedians
Chilean male film actors
Chilean musicians
Chilean television presenters
Chilean television personalities
Fernando